Diloxia fimbriata is a species of snout moth (family Pyralidae) in the genus Diloxia. It was described by George Hampson in 1896. It is found in India.

The wingspan is 24–30 mm.

References

Moths described in 1896
Pyralinae